The 2015 Women's Junior Pan-American Volleyball Cup was the third edition of the bi-annual women's volleyball tournament, played by six countries from April 17 – 25, 2015 in Santo Domingo, Dominican Republic.

Competing Nations
Teams who were able to participate in this tournament are those who took part at their respective continental junior championships, South America and NORCECA.  Cuba and Colombia declined to participate and Peru and Guatemala failed to apply.

Competition format
The competition format for the 2015 Junior Pan American Volleyball Cup divides the 6 participating teams in 1 group of 6.

The best team from Group A and Group B will advance to the semifinals, the second and third teams from Group B will play the quarterfinals against the second and third teams from Pool A.

Pool standing procedure
Match won 3–0: 5 points for the winner, 0 point for the loser
Match won 3–1: 4 points for the winner, 1 points for the loser
Match won 3–2: 3 points for the winner, 2 points for the loser
In case of tie, the teams were classified according to the following criteria:
points ratio and sets ratio

Preliminary round

Group A

Final round

Fifth place match

Bronze medal match

Final

Final standing

Individual awards

Most Valuable Player
 
Best Setter
 
Best Opposite
 
Best Outside Hitters
 
 
Best Middle Blockers
 
 
Best Libero

References

External links

Women's Pan-American Volleyball Cup
Junior Pan-American Volleyball Cup
2015 in Dominican Republic women's sport
International volleyball competitions hosted by the Dominican Republic